BEEB was a weekly, children's magazine centred on the BBC's most popular programmes at the time of its publication.  It was published by Polystyle Publications and was created as a competitor to ITV's Look-in magazine.  It lasted 20 issues between 29 January 1985  and 11 June 1985.  There was no announcement in the last issue, or any resolution to the ongoing comic serials.

Typical contents
One By One.  This followed the popular zoo vet series, based on the David Taylor books.
Grange Hill. These were specially written stories. Drawn by John Armstrong. Each issue's Grange Hill comic was 3 pages long.
The Tripods. These were very well drawn stories, partly in colour on three pages. Drawn by John M. Burns. As the series progressed an attempt was made to appeal to female readers by introducing the young woman character of Fizzio. 
Bananaman, in colour, on a single page. These have recently been reprinted in The Dandy, the third comic that Bananaman appeared in, after Nutty and BEEB, and before The Funday Times.
The Family-Ness, in colour, on a single page.
General articles about BBC programmes, usually children's shows, with frequent references to Blue Peter, Doctor Who and Grange Hill.
Pin-ups of pop stars and other celebrities.
Competitions and letters from the readers.

Issues

References

BBC publications
Children's magazines published in the United Kingdom
Weekly magazines published in the United Kingdom
Defunct magazines published in the United Kingdom
Magazines established in 1985
Magazines disestablished in 1985
1985 establishments in the United Kingdom
 Television magazines published in the United Kingdom